The Ghent–Terneuzen Canal (Dutch: Kanaal van Gent naar Terneuzen), also known as the "Sea Canal" (Zeekanaal) is a canal linking Ghent in Belgium to the port of Terneuzen on the Westerschelde (Scheldt) Estuary in the Netherlands, thereby providing the former with better access to the sea.

History
The canal was constructed between 1823 and 1827 on the initiative of the Dutch King: Belgium (as it subsequently became) and the Netherlands had become a united country under the terms agreed at the Congress of Vienna. After Belgium broke away in 1830, traffic to and from Belgium was blocked by the Dutch until 1841.

Between 1870 and 1885, the canal was enlarged to a depth of six and a half metres at its centre, and to a width of 17 metres at its base and 68 metres at the surface level:  bridges being rebuilt accordingly along the Belgian sector.

The famous Cluysen - Ter Donck Regatta was organised here for many decades (1888-1954)
and during the 1913 Expo of Ghent the European Rowing Championships took place on the canal.

Further development and major enlargement took place during the subsequent century, most notably during the early 1960s.

In February 2015, Flanders and the Netherlands signed a treaty for the construction of a new lock at Terneuzen, scheduled for completion in 2021 and costing €920M. The new lock is about the same size as those of the contemporaneous expansion project of the Panama Canal.

Today

The largest permitted vessel size has increased, correspondingly, to 265 metres long x 34 metres wide, with a draught of up to 12.5 metres.

References

External links

 Portaal van Vlaanderen 

International canals
Canals in the Rhine–Meuse–Scheldt delta
Canals opened in 1827
Canals in Flanders
Canals in East Flanders
Canals in Zeeland
Zeelandic Flanders
Geography of Ghent
Terneuzen
1827 establishments in the Netherlands
19th-century architecture in the Netherlands